The family Annulariidae is a taxonomic family of small operculate land snails in the superfamily Littorinoidea.

Genera
Subfamily Abbottellinae Watters, 2016
 Abbottella Henderson & Bartsch, 1920
 Abbottipoma Watters, M. L. Smith & Sneddon, 2020
 Annularisca Henderson & Bartsch, 1920
 Arenabbottella Watters, M. L. Smith & Sneddon, 2020
 Lagopoma Bartsch, 1946
 Leiabbottella Watters, 2010
 Meganipha F. G. Thompson, 1978
 Microabbottella Watters, M. L. Smith & Sneddon, 2020
 Opisthosiphon Dall, 1905
 Preclaripoma Watters, M. L. Smith & Sneddon, 2020
 Rolleia Crosse, 1891
Subfamily Annulariinae Henderson & Bartsch, 1920
 Adamsiella L. Pfeiffer, 1851
 Annularia Schumacher, 1817
 Annularops Henderson & Bartsch, 1920
 Blaesospira Crosse, 1891
 Chittypoma Watters, 2006
 Cistulops H. B. Baker, 1924
 Eyerdamia Bartsch, 1946
 Juannularia de la Torre & Bartsch, 1941
 Lugarenia de la Torre & Bartsch, 1941
 Megannularia Watters, 2006
 Saulaepoma Watters, 2006
 Weinlandipoma Bartsch, 1946
 Xenopoma Crosse, 1891
 Xenopomoides de la Torre & Bartsch, 1941
Subfamily Chondropomatinae Henderson & Bartsch, 1920
 Aguayotudora de la Torre & Bartsch, 1941
 Annularodes Henderson & Bartsch, 1920
 Bonairea H. B. Baker, 1924
 Chondropoma L. Pfeiffer, 1847
 Chondrops Bartsch, 1946
 Chondrothyrium Henderson & Bartsch, 1920
 Colonella Bartsch, 1946
 Crossepoma Bartsch, 1946
 Cubadamsiella de la Torre & Bartsch, 1941
 Diplopoma L. Pfeiffer, 1859
 Parachondria Dall, 1905
 Parachondrops Henderson & Bartsch, 1920
 Rhytidopoma Sykes, 1901
 Rhytidothyra Henderson & Bartsch, 1920
Subfamily Rhytidopomatinae Henderson & Bartsch, 1920
 Colonina Bartsch, 1946
 Ramsdenia Preston, 1913
Subfamily Tudorinae Watters, 2006
 Annularita Henderson & Bartsch, 1920
 Articulipoma Bartsch, 1946
 Choanopomops H. B. Baker, 1928
 Chondropomartes Henderson & Bartsch, 1920
 Chondropomella Bartsch, 1932
 Chondropometes Henderson & Bartsch, 1920
 Chondropomium Henderson & Bartsch, 1920
 Chondrothyra Henderson & Bartsch, 1920
 Clydonopoma Pilsbry, 1933
 Colobostylus Crosse & P. Fischer, 1888
 Dallsiphona de la Torre & Bartsch, 1941
 Eutudora Henderson & Bartsch, 1920
 Gouldipoma Watters, 2006
 Gutierrezium de la Torre & Bartsch, 1938
 Halotudora Watters, 2006
 Licina Gray, 1847
 Paradoxipoma Watters, 2014
 Sallepoma Bartsch, 1946
 Samanicola Watters, 2006
 Superbipoma Watters & Larson, 2017
 Tudora Gray, 1850
 Tudorina de la Torre & Bartsch, 1941
 Tudorisca Henderson & Bartsch, 1920
 Turrithyra de la Torre & Bartsch, 1938

 Tessaripoma Watters, 2016
 Incertipoma Bartsch, 1946 (temporary name)

References

 Watters, G. Thomas. The Caribbean land snail family Annulariidae: A revision of the higher taxa and a catalog of the species. Backhuys Publishers, 2006.
 Watters, G.T. (2014) A preliminary review of the Annulariidae of the Lesser Antilles. Nautilus, 128 (3), 65–90
 Watters G.T., Smith M.L. & Sneddon D.J. (2020). The subfamily Abbottellinae (Gastropoda: Annulariidae): origins, associations, and a review of the Hispaniolan taxa. The Nautilus. 134(1): 1-34.

External links
 SIMONE, LUIZ RICARDO L. "COMPARATIVE MORPHOLOGY AND PHYLOGENY OF REPRESENTATIVES OF THE SUPERFAMILIES OF ARCHITAENIOGLOSSANS AND THE ANNULARIIDAE (MOLLUSCA, CAENOGASTROPODA)'(With 354 figures)." Arquivos do Museu National 62.4 (2004): 387-504
 Watters, G. Thomas. "A revision of the Annulariidae of Central America (Gastropoda: Littorinoidea)." Zootaxa 3878.4 (2014): 301-350